Admiral Sir Ralph Delaval (c.1641–c.1707) was an English admiral.

He was a member of a junior branch of the Delaval family of Seaton Delaval, Northumberland. He was born at North Dissington, Ponteland, Northumberland, which estate he ultimately inherited and sold to Edward Collingwood of Byker in 1673.

He joined the navy at a young age and progressed under the patronage of the Duke of York, later James II, to become Captain of the third rater, HMS York.

He was knighted and raised to Vice-Admiral of the Blue on the accession of William III and led the Blue Squadron in the rear division in the Battle of Beachy Head against the French on 10 July 1690.

He was promoted to Vice Admiral of the Red in 1692. At the Battle of La Hogue on 9 May 1692, he personally commanded HMS Royal Sovereign and was responsible for the destruction of the French flagship Soleil Royal and two others at Cherbourg. His Royal Sovereign log books (1691–1693) are preserved in the archives of the New York Public Library.

In 1693, Delaval, along with Henry Killigrew and Cloudesley Shovell replaced Edward Russell as commander-in-chief. However, in the summer the French isolated and inflicted severe damage on the Smyrna convoy near Lagos, Portugal, for which Delaval, Killigrew and Shovell were severely criticised. A censure motion was laid in the House of Commons alleging 'notorious and treacherous mismanagement'. William was forced to dismiss his naval advisor Secretary of State the Earl of Nottingham, and appoint Russell as the new commander-in-chief.

Shortly thereafter, Delaval was involved in intrigue at court where he was regarded as a possible Jacobite sympathiser and he lost his command. He retired to Northumberland. He died in 1707 and was buried in Westminster Abbey.

Notes

References
 Roger N.A.M. The Command of the Ocean: A Naval History of Britain 1649–1815, Penguin Group, (2006). 
 Greys Debates in the House of Commons 1769 Volume 10

External links
  Delavals account of the Battle of La Hogue

Royal Navy admirals
English admirals
Lords of the Admiralty
17th-century Royal Navy personnel
People from Ponteland
Military personnel from Northumberland
Year of birth uncertain